Kevin Johnson (born December 27, 1973 in Winder, Georgia) was a football player in the CFL for seven years. Johnson played linebacker for the Calgary Stampeders and Montreal Alouettes from 1999-2005. He played college football at the Ohio State University.

External links
Career Bio

1973 births
Living people
People from Winder, Georgia
Sportspeople from the Atlanta metropolitan area
Players of American football from Georgia (U.S. state)
American football linebackers
Ohio State Buckeyes football players
American players of Canadian football
Canadian football linebackers
Calgary Stampeders players
Montreal Alouettes players